Ronald Edwin Mabra (June 4, 1951 – November 10, 2017) was an American football defensive back who played for the Philadelphia Bell in 1974, the Atlanta Falcons 1975-1976, the New York Jets in 1978, and the Winnipeg Blue Bombers in 1979.

Career

Gallery

References

1951 births
2017 deaths
20th-century African-American sportspeople
African-American players of American football
People from Talladega, Alabama
American football defensive backs
Atlanta Falcons players
Howard Bison football players
Players of American football from Alabama